Baron Ailwyn, of Honingham in the County of Norfolk, was a title in the Peerage of the United Kingdom. It was created on 1 July 1921 for the Conservative politician Sir Ailwyn Fellowes. He was the younger son of Edward Fellowes, 1st Baron de Ramsey. Lord Ailwyn was succeeded by the eldest of his four sons, Ronald, the second Baron. He was a lieutenant-colonel in the Rifle Brigade. He was childless and was succeeded by his younger brother Eric, the third Baron. He was a captain in the Royal Navy. He was also childless and was succeeded by his youngest brother, Carol, the fourth Baron. Like his elder brothers, he was childless and the title became extinct on his death in 1988.

Barons Ailwyn (1921)
Ailwyn Edward Fellowes, 1st Baron Ailwyn (1855–1924)
Ronald Townshend Fellowes, 2nd Baron Ailwyn (1886–1936)
Eric William Edward Fellowes, 3rd Baron Ailwyn (1887–1976)
Carol Arthur Fellowes, 4th Baron Ailwyn (1896–1988)

See also
Baron de Ramsey

References
www.thepeerage.com

Extinct baronies in the Peerage of the United Kingdom
Noble titles created in 1921
Noble titles created for UK MPs